War Eagle is the battle cry, yell, or motto of Auburn University.

War Eagle may also refer to:

Places in the United States
War Eagle, Arkansas, an unincorporated community
War Eagle, West Virginia, an unincorporated community in Mingo County
War Eagle Creek, a river in Arkansas
War Eagle Bridge, a historic bridge in War Eagle, Arkansas
War Eagle Creek Bridge, a bridge crossing the War Eagle Creek in Madison County, Arkansas
War Eagle Mill, a working gristmill located on War Eagle Creek
War Eagle Field, a former airfield in the Mojave Desert

People
War Eagle (American football), Native American football player
War Eagle (Dakota Leader), a Yankton Sioux Chief
John War Eagle

Other
War Eagle Conference, an athletic conference in Iowa
"War Eagle,"  an episode of the drama series Longmire
War Eagle, Arkansas (film), a 2007 film